Viktoriya Kovyreva (born 17 December 1975) is a Kazakhstani sprinter. She competed in the 100 metres at the 2000 Summer Olympics and the 2004 Summer Olympics.

References

1975 births
Living people
Athletes (track and field) at the 2000 Summer Olympics
Athletes (track and field) at the 2004 Summer Olympics
Kazakhstani female sprinters
Olympic athletes of Kazakhstan
Asian Games medalists in athletics (track and field)
Asian Games bronze medalists for Kazakhstan
Athletes (track and field) at the 2002 Asian Games
Medalists at the 2002 Asian Games
Sportspeople from Almaty
Olympic female sprinters
20th-century Kazakhstani women
21st-century Kazakhstani women